Marmaduke Williams (April 6, 1774 – October 29, 1850) was a Democratic-Republican U.S. Congressman from North Carolina from 1803 to 1809.

Born in Caswell County, North Carolina, Williams studied law and was admitted to the North Carolina bar. He was elected to the North Carolina State Senate, serving 1802, and then was elected that same year to the 8th United States Congress. Williams was re-elected twice, serving in the 9th and 10th Congresses (March 4, 1803 – March 3, 1809). He declined to run for a fourth term and moved to the Mississippi Territory in 1810, then to Huntsville, Alabama, and by 1819, to Tuscaloosa, Alabama.

Williams was a delegate to the Alabama Constitutional Convention of 1819 and ran unsuccessfully that year for the post of Governor of Alabama. He served in the Alabama House of Representatives from 1821 to 1839, was the Secretary of the Board of Trustees of The University of Alabama from 1835 to 1841 and was a judge of the Tuscaloosa County court from 1832 to 1842.

He was a brother of Mississippi Territorial Governor Robert Williams (1766–1836). On October 26, 1798, in Caswell County, North Carolina, he married Agnes Payne (1775–1850), a first cousin of Dolley Madison, and they raised 9 children.  He was first cousin of the brothers:  Robert Williams (1773–1821), John Williams (Tennessee politician) (1778–1837) and Lewis Williams (1786–1842). He was the grandfather of Lafayette Guild (1825–1870). He died in Tuscaloosa in 1850 and is buried in Greenwood Cemetery.  His Tuscaloosa home has been completely renovated.

References

1774 births
1850 deaths
Members of the Alabama House of Representatives
North Carolina state senators
Alabama Democratic-Republicans
People from Caswell County, North Carolina
Democratic-Republican Party members of the United States House of Representatives from North Carolina